The 1957 World Modern Pentathlon Championships were held in Stockholm, Sweden.

Medal summary

Men's events

Medal table

See also
 World Modern Pentathlon Championships

References

 Sport123

World Modern Pentathlon Championship, 1957
Modern pentathlon in Sweden
World Modern Pentathlon Championship, 1957
International sports competitions hosted by Sweden